The Use Your Illusion Tour was a concert tour by American rock band Guns N' Roses which ran from January 20, 1991, to July 17, 1993. It was not only the band's longest tour, but one of the longest concert tours in rock history, consisting of 194 shows in 27 countries. It was also a source of much infamy for the band, due to riots, late starts, cancellations and outspoken rantings by Axl Rose.

History
The Use Your Illusion Tour was a promotional tour for the albums Use Your Illusion I and Use Your Illusion II. The tour started on May 24, 1991, approximately when the long-awaited follow-up to G N' R Lies was to be released, and ended over two years later. The release date of the album, or albums, since there were now two of them, was pushed back to September but the tour began as originally scheduled.  The tour marked a high point in the popularity of Guns N' Roses, with a total of over 7 million fans attending, and accompanied by high worldwide album sales.

Live recordings from the tour would later be issued as a two video/DVD set, Use Your Illusion I and II, featuring footage from a 1992 concert in Tokyo, Japan and would also provide content for the 2-disc set Live Era: '87-'93. The tour also provided a large volume of footage for music videos, including "Dead Horse" and their popular cover of Paul McCartney's "Live and Let Die". Also, at one time, footage of much of the tour was to be released as a documentary, titled The Perfect Crime. The footage consisted of Guns N' Roses' time on the road, concert footage, and information about the riots and other major events of the tour. It was never released and never spoken about after the tour. Slash mentioned in his biography that Axl Rose is in control of the footage and that Slash would be interested in viewing it, as he thought it captured some "killer moments" from the tour.

The conduct of the band, and particularly Axl Rose, during the Use Your Illusion Tour generated negative press, notably from the magazines Spin, Kerrang!, Circus, and Hit Parader. These magazines were mentioned in the song "Get in the Ring" where Axl Rose attacked writers who had written negative articles dealing with Rose's attitude.

The shows were all varied, as a setlist was never chosen by the band. They did, however, usually open with "Welcome to the Jungle", "It's So Easy", "Nightrain" or "Perfect Crime" and would shortly after one another play "Mr. Brownstone" or "Live and Let Die", and closed with "Paradise City". Each show featured many guitar solos from Slash (including the "Theme From the Godfather") and a drum solo from drummer Matt Sorum, usually six minutes in length.

The Use Your Illusion Tour was massive not just in the number and size of performances, but also in its technical aspects and the size of the crew. A total of 130 working personnel traveled with the band during the tour, with the band using two different stages to enable faster setup. The trade magazine Performance named the tour crew "Crew of the Year" for 1991.

Duff McKagan revealed in a 2015 interview that the band didn't make profit on the tour until 1993 due to the extravagant costs.

Notable events
At the June 10, 1991, show, at the Saratoga Performing Arts Center, Axl Rose requested that the crowd chant "Get in the ring!" This was recorded for the song of that name on Use Your Illusion II.

On June 13, 1991, during the show in Philadelphia, Rose erupted after a fan fought with Guns N' Roses' photographer Robert John. When the fan kicked the camera out of his hands, Rose cursed him out and challenged him to a fight. After the fan was ejected from the concert, the show continued.

On Tuesday, July 2, 1991, at a show at the Riverport Amphitheatre in Maryland Heights, Missouri, near St. Louis, Rose spotted a spectator recording the concert with a video camera and jumped into the audience after him when concert security failed to respond to his request to apprehend the man. Returning to the stage, Rose declared: "Well, thanks to the lame-ass security, I'm going home!" then slammed the mic on the stage, sparking the infamous Riverport riot. Rose then stormed off the stage; some people thought when he slammed the mic, because of the noise, that he shot someone. Slash told them, "He just slammed his mic on the floor. We're outta here." He proceeded to throw his guitar pick into the crowd and follow Rose. The band followed. The band was looking to come back out and finish the show, but as police and security tried to calm down the audience, a riot broke out. The footage was captured by Robert John who was documenting the entire tour. Sixty fans were injured. The band lost most of their equipment and Rose was charged with inciting a riot. He was acquitted due to lack of evidence. The band would later express their feelings regarding the incident by including the message "fuck you, St. Louis!" in the liner notes of both Use Your Illusion albums.

On August 3, 1991, the day mixing of the Illusion albums was finished, the band played the longest show of the tour at the L.A. Forum. It lasted three and a half hours.

On November 7, 1991, Izzy Stradlin quit the band after the release of Use Your Illusion I and Use Your Illusion II; his last show was on August 31, 1991, at Wembley Stadium. On December 5, replacement rhythm guitarist Gilby Clarke made his debut in Worcester, at the first show after the release of Use Your Illusion I and Use Your Illusion II.

On April 13 and 14, 1992, two concerts had to be canceled when a warrant was issued for Rose's arrest due to his behavior at the St. Louis show.

On April 20, 1992, the band performed at the Freddie Mercury Tribute Concert, an effort for AIDS Awareness in London. The band was a controversial addition to the lineup, as many in the gay community were still angry over Rose using a gay slur in "One in a Million." The band opened with "Paradise City" and closed with "Knockin' on Heaven's Door." During the famous "Paradise City" opening, Axl pointed at protesters in the audience and yelled, "SHOVE IT!" He had planned to address the controversy between songs, but was asked not to by the band as it would pull the spotlight from Queen and Freddie Mercury. As Slash concluded a short cover of Alice Cooper's "Only Women Bleed", Duff McKagan kept an eye on Rose, who approached the front of the stage. When Slash finished the song, then strummed the beginning of "Knockin' on Heaven's Door", McKagan walked over to Rose and shook his hand in appreciation. Later in the show, Slash joined Joe Elliott of Def Leppard and the surviving members of Queen for "Tie Your Mother Down." Rose sang "We Will Rock You" and finished "Bohemian Rhapsody" with Elton John and Queen. The show was broadcast live around the world via satellite, gathering the largest audience for a music concert in history.

On August 8, 1992, in Montreal, Quebec, during the famously troubled Guns N' Roses/Metallica Stadium Tour portion, Metallica frontman/guitarist James Hetfield's left arm was badly burned due to misunderstanding about pyrotechnics added to Metallica's stage setup. Metallica was forced to end their set early. However, Guns N' Roses were not present at the arena to begin before the scheduled time, leaving fans to wait several hours before they took the stage. A few songs into the very late set, audio problems resulted in the band not being able to hear themselves play. Rose stormed off stage due to vocal issues, sparking a riot that spilled into the streets.

On November 25, 1992, the band performed in Caracas, Venezuela, in front of a crowd of 45,000. Just two days later, the Venezuela Air Force launched a failed military coup, making it impossible for half of the band's crew and all of their equipment to leave the country.

On November 30, 1992, the band performed for the first time in Bogotá, Colombia. When they started to play "November Rain", a soft rain fell over the city and stopped right after they finished the song. Rose later stated this was a special moment for him because "November Rain" was #1 in Colombia for 60 weeks. Rose stated that the band were at risk of electrocution and must stop to dry the stage. The band moved backstage and returned to finish with "Don't Cry" and "Paradise City."

On December 2, 1992, the band performed in Santiago, Chile, at Estadio Nacional in front of 85,535 people, breaking an attendance record in the stadium. At their arriving at Chile, Rose attacked some graphic reporters and a cameraman was injured. Before the concert, Rose got drunk and arrived at the stadium two hours late. While the band performed "Civil War" some people threw bottles to the stage, and Rose stopped four minutes into the show. The concert ended with 50 people arrested outside the stadium, and a teenage fan with several injuries, dying two days later.

In February 1993, Gilby Clarke told BBC Radio 1's Friday Rock Show: "For the last year and a half, we had a film crew with us. They do film every show and things backstage: hotel rooms, everything. And what we're gonna do at the end of the whole tour – which is actually after we're done in Europe – is put it all together, and we are gonna make a movie. It's pretty candid right now, so it's gonna be really great. The difference between ours and Madonna's is that ours isn't scripted. This movie is actually things that are happening around us." He also said Guns N' Roses would record an MTV Unplugged during their stay in Russia. Neither of these plans came to fruition.

Stradlin returned for several shows in 1993, deputizing for an injured Clarke. "It was weird," he recalled. "We toured Greece, Istanbul, London [sic]. I liked that side of it – seeing some places I'd never seen… [But] money was a big sore point. I did the dates just for salary… [At the end] I didn't actually say 'See you', cos they were all fucked up… It was like playing with zombies."

On July 17, 1993, the band performed in Buenos Aires, Argentina at River Plate Stadium in front of 80,000 people. It was their last show with most of the Use Your Illusion-era lineup (Rose, Slash, McKagan, Sorum, Reed, and Clarke). The tour was renamed the "Skin N' Bones Tour" for the last couple of legs and included an unplugged performance in a living room set. A highlight of the night was Cozy Powell dressed as a Domino's Pizza delivery boy playing drums with Sorum.

Setlists

First typical setlist 
(Taken from the Inglewood, California Great Western Forum show on August 3, 1991)

 "Perfect Crime"
 "Mr. Brownstone"
 "Right Next Door To Hell"
 "Bad Obsession"
 "Live and Let Die" (Paul McCartney and Wings cover)
 "It's So Easy"
 "Yesterdays"
 "Dust N' Bones"
 "Double Talkin' Jive"
 "Civil War"
 "Patience"
 "You Could Be Mine"
 "November Rain"
 "My Michelle"
 "14 Years"
 "Nightrain"
 "Welcome to the Jungle"
 "Pretty Tied Up"
 "Rocket Queen"
 "Don't Cry" (Original lyrics) (with Shannon Hoon of Blind Melon)
 "Knockin' on Heaven's Door" (Bob Dylan cover)
 "You Ain't the First" (with Shannon Hoon of Blind Melon)
 "Used to Love Her"
 "Move to the City"
 "Sweet Child o' Mine"
 "You're Crazy" (with Sebastian Bach of Skid Row)
 "Locomotive"
 "Out ta Get Me"
 "Dead Horse"
 "Estranged"
 "Paradise City"

Second typical setlist 
(Taken from the Tokyo, Japan Tokyo Dome show on February 22, 1992)

 "Nightrain"
 "Mr. Brownstone"
 "Live and Let Die" (Paul McCartney and Wings cover)
 "It's So Easy"
 "Bad Obsession"
 "Attitude" (McKagan sang lead vocals) (Misfits cover)
 "Pretty Tied Up"
 "Welcome to the Jungle"
 "Don't Cry" (Original lyrics)
 "Double Talkin' Jive" 
 "Civil War"
 "Wild Horses" (The Rolling Stones cover)
 "Patience"
 "You Could Be Mine"
 "November Rain"
 "Sweet Child o' Mine"
 "So Fine"
 "Rocket Queen"
 "Move to the City"
 "Knockin' on Heaven's Door" (Bob Dylan cover)
 "Estranged"
 "Paradise City"

Third typical setlist 
(Taken from the Stuttgart, Germany Neckarstadion show on May 28, 1992)

 "It's So Easy"
 "Mr. Brownstone"
 "Live and Let Die" (Paul McCartney and Wings cover)
 "Bad Obsession"
 "Attitude"  (McKagan sang lead vocals (Misfits cover)
 "Don't Cry" (Original lyrics)
 "Double Talkin' Jive" 
 "Civil War"
 "Welcome to the Jungle"
 "Wild Horses" (The Rolling Stones cover)
 "Patience"
 "It's Alright" (Black Sabbath cover)
 "November Rain"
 "You Could Be Mine"
 "Sweet Child o' Mine"
 "Knockin' on Heaven's Door" (Bob Dylan cover)
 "Estranged"
 "Paradise City"

Fourth typical setlist 
(Taken from the Paris, France Hippodrome de Vincennes show on June 6, 1992)

 "It's So Easy"
 "Mr. Brownstone"
 "Live and Let Die" (Paul McCartney and Wings cover)
 "Attitude" (McKagan sang lead vocals) (Misfits cover)
 "Bad Obsession"
 "Always on the Run" (Lenny Kravitz cover) (with Lenny Kravitz)
 "Double Talkin' Jive" 
 "Civil War"
 "Wild Horses" (The Rolling Stones cover)
 "Patience"
 "You Could Be Mine"
 "It's Alright" (originally performed by Black Sabbath)
 "November Rain"
 "Sweet Child o' Mine"
 "Welcome to the Jungle"
 "Knockin' on Heaven's Door" (Bob Dylan cover)
 "Mama Kin" (Aerosmith cover) with Steven Tyler and Joe Perry of Aerosmith)
 "Train Kept A-Rollin'" (Tiny Bradshaw cover) (with Steven Tyler and Joe Perry of Aerosmith)
 "Don't Cry" (Original lyrics)
 "Paradise City"

Fifth typical setlist 
(Taken from the Buenos Aires, Argentina River Plate Stadium show on July 17, 1993)

 "Nightrain"
 "Mr. Brownstone"
 "Yesterdays"
 "Live and Let Die" (Paul McCartney and Wings cover)
 "Attitude" (McKagan sang lead vocals) (Misfits cover)
 "Welcome to the Jungle"
 "Double Talkin' Jive"
 "Dead Flowers" (The Rolling Stones cover)
 "You Ain't the First"
 "You're Crazy"
 "Used to Love Her"
 "Patience"
 "Knockin' on Heaven's Door" (Bob Dylan cover)
 "November Rain"
 "Dead Horse"
 "You Could Be Mine"
 "Sweet Child o' Mine"
 "Paradise City"

Tour dates

Personnel
Guns N' Roses
W. Axl Rose – lead vocals, piano, whistle, whistling, acoustic guitar, tambourine, backing vocals
Slash – lead guitar, acoustic guitar, backing vocals, talkbox, slide guitar
Izzy Stradlin – rhythm guitar, backing vocals, acoustic guitar, lead vocals (1991; 1993 – five shows)
Duff McKagan – bass, backing vocals, lead vocals, drum
Matt Sorum – drums, percussion, backing vocals, drum
Dizzy Reed – keyboards, piano, backing vocals, percussion, organ, tambourine
Gilby Clarke – rhythm guitar, backing vocals, drum (1991–1993)
Touring musicians
Teddy Andreadis – keyboards, backing vocals, harmonica, tambourine (1991–1993)
Roberta Freeman – backing vocals, tambourine (1991–1993)
Traci Amos – backing vocals, tambourine (1991–1993)
Diane Jones – backing vocals, tambourine (1991–1993)
Cece Worrall-Rubin – saxophone (1991–1993)
Anne King – trumpet (1991–1993)
Lisa Maxwell – horns (1991–1993)
Additional musicians
Shannon Hoon
Sebastian Bach
Lenny Kravitz (June 6, 1992)
Steven Tyler (June 6, 1992)
Joe Perry (June 6, 1992)
Brian May (June 13, 1992)
Ronnie Wood (January 15, 1993)
Michael Monroe (May 30, 1993)
Tyranny of Time 
Soundgarden
Dumpster
Raging Slab
Faith No More
Skid Row
Smashing Pumpkins
My Little Funhouse
Blind Melon
El Conde del Guacharo
Estadio El Campín
Nine Inch Nails
Brian May (some shows with his band)
Body Count
Motörhead
Pearls & Swine
Rose Tattoo
The Cult
Soul Asylum
Meduza
Suicidal Tendencies
Red Fun
Quireboys

Songs played

From Appetite for Destruction:
 "Welcome to the Jungle"
 "It's So Easy"
 "Nightrain"
 "Out ta Get Me"
 "Mr. Brownstone"
 "Paradise City"
 "My Michelle"
 "Sweet Child o' Mine"
 "You're Crazy"
 "Rocket Queen"

From G N' R Lies:
 "Reckless Life"
 "Nice Boys"
 "Move to the City"
 "Mama Kin/Train Kept A-Rollin'" (with Steven Tyler and Joe Perry of Aerosmith)
 "Patience"
 "Used to Love Her"
 "You're Crazy" (Acoustic)

From Use Your Illusion I:
 "Right Next Door To Hell"
 "Dust N' Bones"
 "Live and Let Die" (Paul McCartney and Wings cover)
 "Don't Cry" (Original lyrics)
 "Perfect Crime"
 "You Ain't the First"
 "Bad Obsession"
 "Back Off Bitch"
 "Double Talkin' Jive"
 "November Rain"
 "The Garden"
 "Garden Of Eden"
 "Bad Apples"
 "Dead Horse"
 "Coma"

From Use Your Illusion II:
 "Civil War"
 "14 Years"
 "Yesterdays"
 "Knockin' on Heaven's Door" (Bob Dylan cover)
 "Breakdown"
 "Pretty Tied Up"
 "Locomotive"
 "So Fine"
 "Estranged"
 "You Could Be Mine"
 "Don't Cry" (Alt. Lyrics)

From "The Spaghetti Incident?":
 "Since I Don't Have You" (Intro)
 "Attitude" (McKagan sang lead vocals)

Other commonly performed songs:
 "It's Alright" (Black Sabbath cover)
 "Wild Horses" (The Rolling Stones cover)
 "Dead Flowers" (The Rolling Stones cover)
 "Always on the Run" (Lenny Kravitz cover) (with Lenny Kravitz)
 "Theme From the Godfather" (Nino Rota cover) (Guitar Solo)
 "Imagine" (John Lennon cover) (Intro)
 "Dust In The Wind" (Todd Rundgren cover) (Intro)
 "It Tastes Good, Don't It?" (Unreleased original) (played during Rocket Queen)
 "I Was Only Joking" (Rod Stewart cover) (Intro)
 "Lucy in the Sky with Diamonds" (The Beatles cover) (Intro)
 "Only Women Bleed" (Alice Cooper cover) (Intro)
 "Mother" (Pink Floyd cover) (Intro)
 "Pinball Wizard" (The Who cover) (Intro)
 "The One" (Elton John cover) (Intro)
 "One" (U2 cover) (Intro)
 "Sail Away Sweet Sister" (Queen cover) (Intro)
 "Bad Time" (Grand Funk Railroad cover) (Intro)
 "Voodoo Child (Slight Return)" (The Jimi Hendrix Experience cover) (Intro)
 "Let It Be" (The Beatles cover) (Guitar Solo)

References

External links
 GNRontour.com
 In depth info and tour diary
 Causes and the riot itself
 Review of Riot Concert Bootleg DVD

1991 concert tours
1992 concert tours
1993 concert tours
Guns N' Roses concert tours